Asbestos Shake is a collaborative studio album by Borbetomagus and Voice Crack, released in 1991 by Agaric Records.

Track listing

Personnel 
Adapted from Asbestos Shake liner notes.

Musicians
 Don Dietrich – saxophone
 Andy Guhl – electronics
 Donald Miller – electric guitar
 Norbert Möslang – electronics, mixing
 Knut Remond – percussion, electronics
 Jim Sauter – saxophone

Production and additional personnel
 Alex Hanimann – cover art
 Andy Rathgeb – recording

Release history

References

External links 
 Asbestos Shake at Discogs (list of releases)

1991 albums
Collaborative albums
Borbetomagus albums